Henri Tuominen (born September 10, 1991) is a Finnish professional ice hockey forward who is currently playing for Ilves in the SM-liiga.

External links

1991 births
Finnish ice hockey centres
Ilves players
Living people
HC TPS players
Sportspeople from Turku